Our Neighborhood Arts and Physical Education, also known as Cool Kiz on The Block, was a South Korean television sports variety show which premiered on 9 April 2013 on KBS2. It was the replacement show of Moonlight Prince. The program's last episode aired on 4 October 2016 and it was succeeded by Trick & True.

History 
It was announced on March 25, 2013 by a staff member at KBS’s entertainment division to media outlet Star News that Kang Ho-dong, Lee Soo-geun, and Kim Byung-man would star as the MC's for a new sports variety show that would replace Moonlight Prince called "Our Neighborhood Arts and Physical Education." He also said that they were hoping to add a few more cast members. It was also announced that Lee Ye-ji will head the program and Moon Eun-ae would be the main writer, from Moonlight Prince and that Choi Jae-young, the main writer for 1 Night 2 Days came up with the idea for the show. KBS said the show would be about everyday people that excel at arts and exercise. The MCs will go to various neighborhood and compete against them and it will be mostly outdoors, but will sometimes be filmed in studio. KBS said that the show would record in early April and the first episode would air on April 9.

On March 27, 2013 it was announced that TVXQ's Max Changmin had been selected as one of the MC's for the program. It was also unfortunately revealed that though Kim Byung-man will appear on the show, he would only be joining temporarily for the show's first project. Jo Dal-han, Park Sung Ho, and SHINee‘s Minho were revealed as the first guests. It was also revealed that the first few episodes would be centered around the ping pong project.

It premiered on April 9 and debuted number one in its timeslot, beating SBS's Hwasin – Controller of the Heart. AGB Nielsen Korea reported on April 10 that the first episode received a 6.2% viewer rating, a solid rating for its time slot.

Format 
One sport is chosen for a period of time and a team consisting of a few celebrities competes against citizens from all across South Korea. A few rules of the sport are customized to suit the broadcasting time. For most of the sports they challenge a local amateur team in an official match after some basic training, but the format is subject to change depending on the sports they are doing: for example, when the sport was taekwondo, the celebrity team chose citizens to train together with them and when tennis was the chosen sport they entered a national competition. So far, the show has covered table tennis, bowling, badminton, basketball, taekwondo, football, tennis, foot volleyball, cycling, swimming, judo, wrestling, volleyball, and archery.

The members of the celebrity team change every time they change sports but a few are fixed members: in a few of the earlier episodes Kang Ho-dong, Lee Soo-geun, and Max Changmin were fixed members, but in later episodes Kang Ho-dong is the only fixed MC while the other members rotate, including Jeong Hyeong-don, John Park, Seo Ji-seok, Oh Man-seok and Yang Sang-guk.

List of episodes

2013

2014

2015

2016

Ratings 

Ratings are based on the Live airing of 우리동네 예체능 on KBS2 on Tuesday 11.10pm kst. 
(Cool Kiz on the block which airs the English subbed version on KBSWorld TV on Tuesday 11.15pm airs 2 episodes late)

In the ratings above, the highest rating of the year will be in red, and the lowest rating of the year will be in blue each year.

In the ratings above, the highest rating of the year will be in red, and the lowest rating of the year will be in blue each year.

In the ratings above, the highest rating of the year will be in red, and the lowest rating of the year will be in blue each year.

In the ratings above, the highest rating of the year will be in red, and the lowest rating of the year will be in blue each year.

References

External links 
 Official Our Neighborhood Arts and Physical Education Website 
 KBS.co.kr Official KBS Website 

Korean Broadcasting System original programming
2013 South Korean television series debuts
2016 South Korean television series endings
South Korean variety television shows
Korean-language television shows
Television series by SM C&C